Dirceu Cabarca (born February 13, 1985) is a Panamanian professional boxer who challenged for the WBC light flyweight title in 2013.

Professional career
On January 12, 2013, Cabarca fought Adrián Hernández for the WBC light flyweight title, but lost by twelfth round unanimous decision.

On April 20, 2013, Cabarca defeated Alcides Martinez by twelfth round majority decision to win the WBC FECARBOX light flyweight title.

Professional boxing record

References

External links

1985 births
Living people
Panamanian male boxers
Super-flyweight boxers
Light-flyweight boxers